St. Mary of the Sea College  is a private Catholic primary and secondary school, located in A Coruña, in the autonomous community of Galicia, Spain. The school was founded by the Society of Jesus in 1964, and covers infant through baccalaureate.

Overview 
The school's building was designed by Miguel Fisac to have an unobstructed view of the sea.

The College's football U16 team came in first among 32 teams, advancing to the intercontinental final in Austria.

See also

 Catholic Church in Spain
 Education in Spain
 List of Jesuit schools

References

Jesuit secondary schools in Spain
Jesuit primary schools in Spain
Education in Galicia (Spain)
Educational institutions established in 1964
1964 establishments in Spain
Buildings and structures in A Coruña